Jawahar Navodaya Vidyalaya, Prakasam is a central government school, situated in Ongole, the headquarters of Prakasham district, Andhra Pradesh.

History
It was aided by Department of Human Resources Development, and part of the Jawahar Navodaya Vidyalaya programme. There are more than 500 JNV's in India. They were occupied in every state except Tamil Nadu. They were established to support the rural people. This concept was brain child of our late Prime minister Sri. P.V.Narasimha Rao.

Every Year December first Sunday they celebrate Alumni meet where all the old students of JNVO come and share their stories and help the school for better improvements. Alumni students of Navodaya recently started 'Jawahar Navodaya Vidyalaya Old Students Association' (Regd No: 60/2012).

Awards
In 2010, the school won the green school award for "effective management of natural resources", from the Centre for Science and Environment (CSE), an NGO, given by Delhi Chief Minister Sheila Dikshit.

References

External links
 Jawahar Navodaya Vidyalaya, Prakasam, website

Schools in Prakasam district
Ongole
Jawahar Navodaya Vidyalayas in Andhra Pradesh
Educational institutions established in 1987
1987 establishments in Andhra Pradesh